Christopher Kennedy Masterson (born January 22, 1980) is an American actor and disc jockey known best for his role as Malcolm's oldest brother Francis on the Fox sitcom Malcolm in the Middle. He is the younger brother of Danny Masterson, and the older half-brother of Alanna Masterson and Jordan Masterson.

Career 
Masterson played Geoff in the direct-to-video movie Dragonheart: A New Beginning, the sequel to Dragonheart. Masterson is best known for his role as Francis, the trouble-making oldest brother of Frankie Muniz's title character in the Fox sitcom Malcolm in the Middle. He took on the role for seven years, from 2000 to 2006. In 2003, he played Edward Linton in MTV's Wuthering Heights. Masterson portrayed a lead character in the films Scary Movie 2, Waterborne, Made for Each Other and Intellectual Property. He guest starred in three episodes of That '70s Show, alongside his brother, Danny. In the USA Network television series White Collar, he played Josh Roland in the episode "Where There's a Will". He also played Scotty O'Neal in the movie My Best Friend's Wedding. In 2012, Masterson had a guest role on the TBS series Men at Work as a concierge named Archie. His brother, Danny Masterson, plays Milo on the show, but the two did not share any scenes together.

Personal life 
Masterson was born on Long Island, New York, the son of Carol Masterson, a manager, and Peter Masterson, an insurance agent. Masterson, like his brother Danny Masterson, is a follower of Scientology. The two have invested in restaurants together. He also has a half-sister, actress Alanna Masterson, and a half-brother, actor Jordan Masterson. Masterson was in a relationship with his brother's That ‘70s Show co-star Laura Prepon from 1999 to 2007.

On June 25, 2019, Masterson married actress Yolanda Pecoraro. In April 2021, she gave birth to their daughter Chiara.

Filmography

References

External links 
 
 "Chris Masterson on Life after 'Malcolm in the Middle'". Interview at adrinkwith.com. Retrieved June 6, 2016.

1980 births
Living people
20th-century American male actors
21st-century American male actors
American male child actors
American male film actors
American male television actors
American Scientologists
Male actors from New York (state)
Masterson family
People from East Williston, New York